School of Saint Anthony, Quezon City (also called SSA or simply Saint Anthony ), was founded in 1982 as Saint Anthony Learning Center by spouses Enrique F. Coralejo and Victoria A. Coralejo. Its patron saint is St. Anthony Mary Claret, who founded the Congregation of Missionary Sons of the Immaculate Heart of Mary. It is located in Ascención Avenue, Lagro, Novaliches District, Quezon City, Philippines. The school is also located at the terminus of Mindanao Avenue.

History
The school began its operations in June 1982. It initially offered Nursery, Kinder and Prep, and gradually expanded to Lower and Middle school, and later to the Upper School (High School). As the institution progressed in both size and population its name was changed from Saint Anthony Learning Center to its current name, School of Saint Anthony.

Levels Offered
AS OF SCHOOL YEAR 2015-2016

Preschool
Nursery
Kindergarten
Lower School
Grades 1-3
Middle School
Grades 4-6
Upper School
Grades 7-10
Grades 11-12 (Senior High, launch:AY 2016–2017)
Senior High School Strands
Science, Technology, Engineering and Mathematics (STEM)
Accounting, Business and Management (ABM)
Humanities and Social Sciences (HUMSS)
Information and Communications Technology (ICT)

Notable Alumni
Sports
 Angeli Tabaquero, Philippine volleyball team captain, 2013 Asian Championship 

Arts and Entertainment
 Van Ferro, Filipino-American actor
 Miles Ocampo, Filipina actress

Gallery

References

Educational institutions established in 1982
1982 establishments in the Philippines
Catholic elementary schools in Metro Manila
Catholic secondary schools in Metro Manila
Schools in Quezon City